Graffilla is a genus of parasitic turbellarian flatworms.

A species within Graffilla, G. pugetensi, is a parasite of the pericardial cavity of the  bivalvian mollusc Macoma nasuta.

Graffilla effects reared and wild clam populations in Italy, Spain, the United States, and France.

References 

Turbellaria genera
Taxa named by Hermann von Ihering